King William Street is a Lower City collector road in Hamilton, Ontario, Canada. It starts off at the western-end at James Street North and is a one-way street (Eastbound) until Mary Street, where it becomes a two-way street that ends at Wentworth Street North. It is named after King William IV of the United Kingdom.

History
In 1922, CKOC radio station (1150 on the AM dial) started up. As of April 2007, it is the oldest radio station in English Canada; second oldest overall. On the air since May 1, 1922. Originally ran as Top-40 format, today it's an "Oldies" radio station. In 1927, CHML, (900 on the AM dial), began operations as a response to censorship of political discussions by Hamilton's first radio station, CKOC. The original owners were Maple Leaf Radio Company, and the "HML" in the callsign stood for "Hamilton Maple Leaf". CHML's broadcast station is on Main Street West in the Lower City. Originally, CKOC's broadcast from the corner of King William and John Streets and was an offshoot of the Wentworth Radio and Supply Company owned by Herb Slack. He figured he could sell more radios if he also owned a radio station and in the spring of 1922 the station became only the third radio station in all of Canada. Other broadcast locations over the years for CKOC include, the 11th floor of the Royal Connaught Hotel in the downtown core, the Lister Block building on James & King Williams Streets and a studio on Garfield Avenue near King & Sherman Avenue North. Today the radio station is based on the Mountain on Upper Wentworth Street, just north of Limeridge Mall.

Landmarks

Note: Listing of Landmarks from West to East.
 Hamilton City Centre (Mall, formerly the Eaton's Centre)
 Lloyd D. Jackson Square (Mall)
 Lister Block Building
 Homegrown Hamilton
 Club Absinthe
 Downtown Bingo Hall (back-end)
 Geyer Studio
 The Baltimore House
 Manta Contemporary Art Gallery
 Hamilton Central Fire Department (just north of King William Street on John Street North)
 Seventy-Seven Night Club
 The Underground, Steel City Music Venue
 Children's International Learning Centre
 Theatre Aquarius, Dofasco Centre for the Performing Arts, downtown 
 Hamilton Regional Police station
 Tweedsmuir Elementary School (demolished in 2006)
 Cathedral High School

Communities
Note: Listing of neighbourhoods from West to East. 
Central - The financial center of Hamilton, Ontario
Beasley
Landsdale

References

MapArt Golden Horseshoe Atlas - Page 647 - Grids G12, G13, G14

External links
The Underground, Steel City Music Venue
Theatre Aquarius, Dofasco Centre for the Performing Arts

Roads in Hamilton, Ontario